RCAF Station Brandon was a Second World War British Commonwealth Air Training Plan (BCATP) station located near Brandon, Manitoba, Canada. It was operated and administered by the Royal Canadian Air Force (RCAF).

History

World War II

The facility was originally built by the Department of National Defense in 1941, for use as a Royal Canadian Air Force flight training school under the British Commonwealth Air Training Plan. On 16 May 1941, No. 12 Service Flying Training School was established at RCAF Station Brandon. The school trained pilots on more advanced multi-engined aircraft including the Cessna Crane and Avro Anson. On 30 March 1945, the school was closed in conjunction with the end of the Second World War. .

Portions of the former RCAF station are now classified as a National Historic Site of Canada.  The Commonwealth Air Training Plan Museum is a popular tourist attraction located at the former station that commemorates the BCATP and the former station.

Aerodrome information 
Six runways were listed as follows:

Relief landing field – Chater

The site was located 5 miles northeast of the town of Chater, Manitoba. The relief field was constructed in the typical triangular pattern. 
Three runways were listed as follows:

At some point after the war the former relief field was sold and decommissioned as an aerodrome. The aerodrome has been declared abandoned.
A review of Google Maps on 7 June 2018 shows a very visible airfield at the listed coordinates.  But runway orientation is flipped top to bottom with the drawing in the book from c.1942.

Relief landing field – Douglas
The site was located north east of the town of Douglas, Manitoba.  
The Relief field was listed as Turf all way, however no dimensional data was provided.
A review of Google Maps on 7 June 2018 shows no visibility of an airfield near the posted coordinates.

Present day
The airport is now operating as the Brandon Municipal Airport

References

Brandon
Military airbases in Manitoba
Military history of Manitoba

Buildings and structures in Brandon, Manitoba
1941 establishments in Manitoba
1945 disestablishments in Manitoba